Bornapally is a village in  Huzurabad mandal in Karimnagar District, Telangana, India.

References

Villages in Karimnagar district